Janet Macabasco is a Filipino singer. She is known for her hits "You Made Me Live Again", "Minsan Pa", and "My Girl, My Woman, My Friend" in a duet with Jose Mari Chan. In the music video version of this song, she is seen sitting on the sofa eating popcorn and has a date with him.

Biography
Her singing career began after winning first prize in a singing contest at Student Canteen.

Personal life
She is married to a TV host, actor, sports commentator and politician, Johnny Revilla with whom she has 4 children.

References

20th-century Filipino women singers
Living people
Year of birth missing (living people)